Wesley College, a school to educate the sons of the laity, opened in 1838 in new buildings designed by William Flockton on Glossop Road, Sheffield, England. It was founded by Rev. Samuel Dousland Waddy (1804–1876) to "supply a generally superior and classical education, combined with religious training in the principles of Methodism" and was initially called the "Wesleyan Proprietary Grammar School". The change in name to Wesley College seems to have taken place in 1844, when a "Royal Warrant, constituting the Sheffield Wesley College a college of the University of London was forwarded to Mr Waddy (subsequently Governor, from 1844 to 1862) by Sir James Graham, which empowered the college to issue certificates to candidates for examination for the several degrees of Bachelor and Master of Arts, and Bachelor and Doctor of Laws". A year later it spurred Rev. James Gillman, William Ferguson, William Stewart and Thomas Waugh in Dublin, Ireland to consider creating a similar school in Dublin. The school accepted its first 90 boarders on 8 August 1838.  By 1841 the number of pupils had increased to 172.
In 1905 Wesley College was purchased by Sheffield Council and merged with Sheffield Royal Grammar School to form King Edward VII School (Upper School Site), named after the reigning monarch. The building was recently refurbished, with the addition of a sports hall and science block, as part of the BSF programme

Headmasters of Wesley College

Governors of Wesley College 

[Wesley College was run from 1837 to 1888 by a 'Dyarchy', comprising the Governor and the Headmaster, the Governor being the senior of the pair (in theory).]

Notable alumni of Wesley College 
 Robert Bownas Mackie (1820–1885) – English politician and judge
 Samuel Danks Waddy (1830–1902) – English politician, Judge (son of Samuel Dousland Waddy, above)
 William Haswell Stephenson (1836–1918) – Lord Mayor of Newcastle upon Tyne
 Frederick Cawley, 1st Baron Cawley (1850–1937) – cotton merchant and Liberal politician
Leonard Cockayne (1855–1934) – horticulturist, botanist
 Hillson Beasley (1855–1936) – architect
 John Bilson (1856–1943) – architect
 Frank Wilson (1859–1918) –  Premier of Western Australia
 Cecil Henry Wilson (1862–1945) – Labour MP for Attercliffe
 William John Hale (1862–1929) – architect
 John Andrew Pearson (1867–1940)  – architect in Canada

Notable teachers of Wesley College 
 Henry Perlee Parker (1795–1873) Drawing-master, Wesley College (1840-1844)

References

 Cornwell, John (2005). King Ted's (1st ed.). King Edward VII School, Sheffield. .

External links
Inspires founding of Wesley College, Dublin

Defunct schools in Sheffield
Educational institutions established in 1838
Grade II* listed buildings in Sheffield
School buildings completed in 1838
Educational institutions disestablished in 1905
1905 disestablishments in England
1838 establishments in England